Ebata is a surname. Notable people with the surname include: 

Lucien Ebata (born 1969), Congolese-Canadian businessman and publisher
Mutsuki Ebata (born 1991), Japanese kickboxer
Rui Ebata (born 1991), Japanese kickboxer
Yukiko Ebata (born 1989), Japanese volleyball player

See also
Obata